Notiophilus biguttatus is a species of ground beetle native to the Palearctic. It was first described by Johan Christian Fabricius in 1779. Sometimes referred to as the Common springtail stalker

In Europe, the species is found in Austria, Belarus, Belgium, Bosnia and Herzegovina, Bulgaria, Corsica, Croatia, Cyprus, the Czech Republic, mainland Denmark, Estonia, the Faroe Islands, Finland, mainland France, Germany, Great Britain and the Isle of Man, Hungary, Iceland, the Republic of Ireland, mainland Italy, Kaliningrad, Latvia, Liechtenstein, Lithuania, Luxembourg, Moldova, Northern Ireland, North Macedonia, mainland Norway, Poland, mainland Portugal, Russia, Sardinia, Sicily, Slovakia, Slovenia, mainland Spain, Sweden, Switzerland, the Netherlands, Ukraine and Yugoslavia.

It has also been introduced to North America with Canadian records for both the Atlantic and Pacific coasts: Nova Scotia, Newfoundland, New Brunswick and British Columbia.

References

External links
Notiophilus biguttatus at Fauna Europaea
Global Biodiversity Information

Nebriinae
Beetles described in 1779